IQ City Medical College and Hospital, established in 2013, is a private medical college located in Durgapur, West Bengal. This medical college hospital is a part of IQ City in Durgapur. This college offers the Bachelor of Medicine and Surgery (MBBS) courses. It is affiliated with the West Bengal University of Health Sciences and recognized by the National Medical Commission. The annual intake of this college in the MBBS course is 180.

This college is situated in Bijra . And it is just 19 Km away from Kaji Najrul Airport Andal.

References

Medical colleges in West Bengal
Affiliates of West Bengal University of Health Sciences
Educational institutions in India with year of establishment missing